Trevi may refer to:

Places in Italy
 Trevi (rione of Rome), one of the official rioni or districts of the modern city of Rome
 Trevi, Umbria, a comune in Perugia province
 Trevi di Terni, a frazione of Terni, in Perugia province
 Trevi nel Lazio, a comune in Frosinone province

Other uses
 TREVI, an internal security group formed by the European Council
 Trevi Fountain, a famous fountain in Rome
 Lancia Trevi, an automobile
 Gloria Trevi, born Gloria de los Ángeles Treviño Ruiz, February 15, 1968 in Monterrey, Nuevo León, a Mexican singer and songwriter
 The Trevi Collection, 14th episode of the American television series Kolchak: The Night Stalker

See also
Trevis (disambiguation)